Endothenia citharistis is a moth of the family Tortricidae first described by Edward Meyrick in 1909. It is found in India, Sri Lanka, Java and Myanmar.

Its larval food plant is Lagerstroemia.

References

Moths of Asia
Moths described in 1909